Sincan is a metropolitan district of Ankara Province in the Central Anatolia region of Turkey, a large town 27 km from the city of Ankara.
Sincan has friendly relations with the municipality of Doboj Jug from Bosnia and Herzegovina.

Sincan District hosts ASO 1. Organize Sanayi Bölgesi, the biggest Organized Industrial Zone in Ankara, operated by Ankara Chamber of Industry.

Demographics

Geography
Sincan stands on a plain surrounded by hills and watered by the Ankara River, a tributary of the Sakarya River. There is some agriculture and light industry in Sincan, but the majority of people commute to Ankara by rail.

The symbol of the municipality is the tulip. The central square is called Lale Meydanı (Turkish for "tulip square"), and every year a tulip festival is held where plastic tulips are handed out in the streets.

History
Even prior to the period of the Ottoman Empire, a village stood in this location, which subsequently grew to when Mustafa Kemal Atatürk commissioned a housing project here for Turkish refugees from Bulgaria. The battle saw fighting during the Battle of the Sakarya in the Turkish War of Independence. This was the furthest spot in Anatolia in which the Greek Army had advanced to.

Well-known residents
 Şafak Sezer, actor and comedian
 Sinan Şamil Sam, professional boxer
 Oğuz Yılmaz, folk musician

Notes

References

External links

 District governor's official website 
 District municipality's official website 
 Local news website 

 
Populated places in Ankara Province